Arasu ( Kingdom) is a 2003 Indian Tamil-language masala film written and directed by Suresh and produced by Babu Raaja. The film stars Sarathkumar, Simran, and Roja, while Sai Kumar, Vadivelu, Delhi Ganesh and Riyaz Khan play supporting roles. The score and soundtrack was composed by Mani Sharma. The film released on 14 April 2003 and was a commercial success.

Plot
The movie starts with Thirunavukkarasu(alias Arasu) murdering a person in Mumbai. Soon, the story shifts to Kumbakonam where Arasu is employed in a temple by Venu Shastri, and stays in Pichumani's house. Arasu's calm nature and responsible behaviour impresses everyone in the locality. Meera, Venu Shastri's daughter, falls in love with Arasu. One day, Arasu sees the news about the release of a criminal from jail and gets angered. He also kills the criminal with the help of a few men. The murder is witnessed by Meera and Venu Shastri.

Everyone in Kumbakonam gets shocked upon knowing that Arasu is a murderer. Arasu meets Venu Shastri's family to disclose the truth. A flashback is shown where Arasu is the only son of Nataraj, who is fondly called Periyavar by his followers in Chennai. Periyavar is a good-natured don striving hard for the welfare of the poor and slum dwellers in Chennai. He is married to Sivagami and they lead a happy life with Arasu.

Sabapathy is a rich business tycoon who goes to any extent for earning money. Trouble erupts between Sabapathy and Periyavar, following which Sabapathy is arrested and sentenced to imprisonment for his illegal activities which led to the deaths of a few young girls. As a means of revenge, Sabapathy's brother Gunashekharan and his henchmen kill Periyavar and Sivagami. Arasu is angered and vows revenge against Sabapathy and his men. Hearing this, Venu Shastri and Meera understand Arasu's position and decide to save him by not disclosing his whereabouts to policemen.

Despite all the attempts by police to arrest Arasu, he successfully kills Sabapathy and Gunashekharan and surrenders to the police. He is sentenced to imprisonment and gets released after five years. In the end, he comes to meet Meera, and both get united.

Cast

Sarath Kumar as Arasu (Thirunavukkarasu) and Periyavar Nataraj (dual role) 
Simran as Meera, Arasu's love interest
Roja as Sivagami, Periyavar's wife and Arasu's mother
Sai Kumar as Sabapathy, the main villain
Vadivelu as Pichumani
Delhi Ganesh as Venu Shastri, Meera's father
Bharat Murali as Police officer
Bhanu Chander
Sudha as Meera's mother
Riyaz Khan as Gunashekharan, Sabapathy's brother
Manivannan as Rahim Bhai
Bharathi as Meera's friend
Minnal Deepa as Thenmozhi
Kottachi as Photographer 
Chitti Babu as Lawyer
Sampath Ram 
Kiran Rathod in an item number

Soundtrack 
These five songs in Arasu were composed by Mani Sharma. Sharma later reused "Malligai Malligai" as "Chinnaga Chinnaga" for Telugu film Tagore.

Production
The film marked the debut of Suresh who had worked with directors like N. Maharajan (Vallarasu), Dharani, and Lingusamy.

Most of the shooting took place at Kumbakonam, in and around the temple areas. Other locations were Mumbai and Kolkata. A fight scene was picturised at the Kumbakonam market area. Five cameras were used and it took ten days to shoot the fight scene. The scene choreographed by Peter Hayen and canned by cinematographer Y. N. Murali, was shot amidst a large crowd including the hero, some stuntmen, character artistes and the locals. Close-up shots of the fight scene was shot again in Chennai Studio where a set resembling the market place was erected.

Release
After this film, Suresh again collaborated with Sarath Kumar for films like Gambeeram and Nam Naadu.

Critical reception
Sify wrote:"the narration is told in a gripping fashion with all the essential ‘masalas’ like punchy dialogues, action, song ‘n’ dance and item numbers". Balaji wrote: "The movie presents the revenge tale in the style of Rajnikanth's Baashha and is quite entertaining".

References

External links 
 

2003 films
Tamil films remade in other languages
2000s Tamil-language films
Films scored by Mani Sharma
Indian films about revenge